Scott Murray is an Australian former professional rugby league footballer who played for the Penrith Panthers.

Murray made his only first-grade appearance for Penrith in the club's round nine loss to North Sydney in the 1992 NSWRL season. Three weeks after debuting, Murray was an injured passenger in the car accident which killed his teammate Ben Alexander. He suffered a broken jaw.

References

External links
Scott Murray at Rugby League project

Year of birth missing (living people)
Living people
Australian rugby league players
Penrith Panthers players